Pontiturboella is a genus of minute sea snails, marine gastropod mollusks or micromollusks in the family Rissoidae.

Species
Species within the genus Pontiturboella include:

 Pontiturboella rufostrigata (Hesse, 1916)

References

Rissoidae
Monotypic gastropod genera